Impalila (sometimes spelt Mpalila) is an island at the far eastern tip of Namibia, bounded on the north by the waters of the Zambezi river and on the south by the Chobe River. It is home to some 2500-3000 people in 25 small villages, including Tswanas (from Botswana) and Subia people (from Namibia).

Impalila is usually accessed from Kasane in Botswana, on the other bank of the Chobe River.  There is a Namibian customs and immigration post on the island.  There is also an airport with a 1,300 metre runway, used for charter flights to bring tourists to the various lodges on the island.  The airport is a relic of a military base used in the 1980s by the South African Defence Forces, strategically positioned within sight of Botswana, Zambia and Zimbabwe. The Namibian Navy has refurbished the Naval Base Impalila and is now operated by Namibian Marine Corps.

References

Islands of Namibia
Botswana–Namibia border crossings
River islands of Africa
Zambezi River
Geography of Zambezi Region